The Pittsburgh Institute of Aeronautics (PIA) is a private technical school focused on aviation-related programs with its main location in West Mifflin, Pennsylvania.  The institution's headquarters is at the Allegheny County Airport and it has three branch campuses. PIA's aviation programs are accredited by the Accrediting Commission of Career Schools and Colleges.

History 
Pittsburgh Institute of Aeronautics was founded in 1929. PIA's short term program offerings began as PIA Truck Driving in 1995.

References

External links
Official website

Education in Pittsburgh
Education in West Virginia
Education in Ohio
Education in Maryland
Education in South Carolina
Aviation schools in the United States
Educational institutions established in 1929
1929 establishments in Pennsylvania